James Aylward may refer to:
 James Aylward (cricketer)  (1741–1827), English cricketer
 James Aylward (politician), Canadian politician
 James P. Aylward (1885–1982), Missouri attorney and Democratic party leader
 James Ambrose Dominic Aylward, English Catholic theologian and poet